Tatochila is a Neotropical genus of butterflies in the family Pieridae.

Species
Tatochila autodice (Hübner, 1818)
Tatochila distincta Jörgensen, 1916
Tatochila homoeodice Paravicini, 1910
Tatochila inversa Hayward, 1949
Tatochila mariae Herrera, 1970
Tatochila mercedis (Eschscholtz, 1821)
Tatochila orthodice (Weymer, 1890)
Tatochila sagittata Röber, 1908
Tatochila stigmadice (Staudinger, 1894)
Tatochila theodice (Boisduval, 1832)
Tatochila xanthodice (Lucas, 1852)

References

Pierini
Pieridae of South America
Pieridae genera
Taxa named by Arthur Gardiner Butler